Ro is an American telehealth company that diagnoses patients, and subsequently prescribes and delivers treatments. The company is headquartered in New York City.

Overview 
Ro was launched as Roman in October 2017 by Zachariah Reitano, Saman Rahmanian, and Rob Schutz. Reitano's experience with erectile dysfunction led him to co-found the company. It has both a telemedicine practice and a pharmacy to distribute medications for erectile dysfunction, hair loss, premature ejaculation, cold sores, and genital herpes treatments. In September 2018, the company renamed itself Ro and began marketing smoking cessation products, under the brand name Zero. In March 2019, Ro launched women's health products aimed at menopause, such as hot flashes and vaginal dryness, under the brand name Rory.  In November 2021, Ro began selling at-home COVID tests, called On/Go, with 10 pharmacy distribution centers in the US.

Ro raised $3.1 million in a seed funding round led by General Catalyst and $88 million in a Series A funding round led by FirstMark Capital. In July 2020, Ro raised $200 million in a series C funding round, bringing its funding total to $376 million. In March 2021, Ro raised $500 million in a series D funding round led by General Catalyst, FirstMark Capital, and TQ Ventures, giving the company a $5 billion valuation.

Ro placed #2 in Wellness in Fast Company's World's Most Innovative Companies in 2019.

Platform 
The company started out as a telehealth business aimed at men to treat issues such as erectile dysfunction and hair loss, before expanding to include business lines for women's health, smoking cessation, and weight loss. It operates outside of the traditional US health insurance system. Patients fill out a dynamic online visit answering questions about their health, lifestyle, medical history, and symptoms. A physician will review the results and prescribe medication if appropriate. Medications will then be shipped in discreet packaging and the medicines will be refilled monthly or quarterly.

Products
 Roman: A digital health clinic for men. It provides treatment to males for conditions including hair loss, erectile dysfunction, and premature ejaculation, with no in-person doctor's visit needed.
 Rory: A digital health clinic for women founded in 2020, with services including skin care and sexual health treatments.
 Zero: A virtual, medical smoking cessation program launched in 2018.
 Ro Pharmacy: An online pharmacy that distributes generic prescriptions across the United States.
 Ro Mind: A mental health clinic treating anxiety and depression, which has since been deprioritized by the company.
 Plenity: A weight management product launched in October 2020, created by Gelesis and sold by Ro.

Acquisitions
In December 2020, the company acquired WorkPath, which sends phlebotomists into patient homes to draw blood for diagnostic tests.

On May 19, 2021, the company announced that it had acquired women's reproductive health company Modern Fertility, in a deal reported to be over $225 million.

On June 30, 2021, the company announced the acquisition of Kit, a startup offering at-home diagnostic tests, including finger prick blood tests and weight measurement tools.

Sponsorships
Ro's Roman brand is the presenting sponsor of the College Basketball Invitational tournament, and an official sponsor of Major League Baseball. Roman sponsored NASCAR Cup Series driver Ryan Newman's No. 6 Roush Fenway Racing car at the 2020 Coca-Cola 600.

References 

2017 establishments in New York City
American companies established in 2017
Companies based in New York City
Health care companies based in New York (state)
Medical technology companies of the United States
Weight loss companies